Kailash Chandra Gahtori (born 15 August 1968) is an Indian businessman and politician who served in the Uttarakhand Legislative Assembly from 2017 until his resignation in 2022, representing the Champawat constituency as a member of the Bharatiya Janata Party.

Biography 
Kailash Chandra Gahtori was born on 15 August 1968 in the Champawat district of Uttarakhand, which was then part of Uttar Pradesh. After graduating from university with an arts degree, Gahtori started a construction company in Madhya Pradesh. Gahtori returned to Uttarakhand in 2002, when he unsuccessfully ran as an independent candidate for the Uttarakhand Legislative Assembly in the 2002 election, running in the Lohaghat constituency. After his defeat, Gahtori returned to managing his business, and he came to own a hotel and two schools in the city of Kashipur.

Gahtori was a longtime member of the Rashtriya Swayamsevak Sangh, a paramilitary organization affiliated with the Bharatiya Janata Party, and he officially joined the BJP in 2012. Later that year, Gahtori was elected to the Champawat district council. Gahtori again ran for the Uttarakhand Legislative Assembly in the 2017 election, running as the BJP candidate in the Champawat constituency; Gahtori defeated Indian National Congress incumbent Hemesh Kharkwal, receiving 36,601 votes compared to Kharkwal's 19,241.

Gahtori ran for re-election in the 2022 Uttarakhand Legislative Assembly election, facing Kharkwal in a rematch. Gahtori again defeated Kharkwal, but by a reduced margin, receiving 32,547 votes compared to Kharkwal's 27,243. However, Pushkar Singh Dhami, the chief minister of Uttarakhand, was defeated in his bid for re-election in the Khatima constituency. In order for Dhami to remain chief minister, Gahtori resigned from his seat on 21 April 2022, allowing Dhami to run for the Champawat constituency in a by-election. Gahtori stated that it was his duty to resign, and that it would be an honour for Champawat to be represented by a chief minister. Dhami won the 31 May by-election in a landslide, receiving over 92% of the vote; his 58,258 votes was the highest number of votes received in a by-election in Uttarakhand's history. After Dhami's victory, The Times of India reported that Gahtori was being considered for a ministerial position.

References 

Living people
1968 births
People from Champawat district
Bharatiya Janata Party politicians from Uttarakhand
20th-century Indian businesspeople
21st-century Indian businesspeople
Businesspeople from Uttarakhand
Businesspeople from Madhya Pradesh
Uttarakhand MLAs 2017–2022
Uttarakhand MLAs 2022–2027